Metzler is a surname. It may refer to:
Alex Metzler (1903–1973), American baseball player
Brenton Metzler, American producer
Chris Metzler, American filmmaker
George Metzler (1912–1949), American racecar driver
Jan Metzler (born 1981), German politician
Jim Metzler (born 1951), American television and film actor
John C. Metzler, Jr. (born 1947), superintendent of Arlington National Cemetery, US, son of John Sr
John C. Metzler, Sr. (1909–1990), superintendent of Arlington National Cemetery
Jost Metzler (1909–1975), German Corvette Captain in World War II
Kurt Laurenz Metzler (born 1941), Swiss sculptor
Léon Metzler (1896–1930), Luxembourgian football player
Lloyd Metzler (1913–1980), American economist
Louis Metzler (1864–1929), American bookkeeper and politician 
Ruth Metzler (born 1964), Swiss politician
Whitney Metzler (born 1978), American swimmer

See also

Occupational surnames